The Hilo noctuid moth (Hypena newelli) was a moth in the family Erebidae. The species was first described by Otto Herman Swezey in 1912. It was endemic to the island of Hawaii and is now extinct.

References

Endemic moths of Hawaii
Extinct moths
Extinct Hawaiian animals
Extinct insects since 1500
Taxonomy articles created by Polbot